Calveley is a civil parish in Cheshire East, England.  It contains three buildings that are recorded in the National Heritage List for England as designated listed buildings, all of which are at Grade II.  This grade is the lowest of the three gradings given to listed buildings and is applied to "buildings of national importance and special interest".  The parish is entirely rural, its listed buildings consisting of a church, a farmhouse, and the stables of a former hall.

See also
Listed buildings in Alpraham
Listed buildings in Bunbury
Listed buildings in Wardle

References
Citations

Sources

Listed buildings in the Borough of Cheshire East
Lists of listed buildings in Cheshire